Mairang is the headquarters of Eastern West Khasi Hills district of Meghalaya, India. It is located at about 40 km from the state capital Shillong, and 45 km (approx.) from Nongstoin along National Highway 106.

Geography
It has an average elevation of 1564 metres (5131 feet).

Demographics
 India census, Mairang had a population of 11,517. Males constitute 50% of the population and females 50%. Mairang has an average literacy rate of 62%, higher than the national average of 59.5%: male literacy is 62%, and female literacy is 63%. In Mairang, 22% of the population is under 6 years of age.

Education
Khadsawphra College & Higher Secondary, Mairang Presbyterian Science College, and Tirot Sing Memorial College are three institutions of higher education in Mairang.

See also
Bynther

References

Cities and towns in Eastern West Khasi Hills district